KTS Weszło Warsaw is a Polish football club based in Warsaw, Masovian Voivodeship. It was founded by media and sports group Weszło and is run as a fan-owned initiative.

They compete in the regional league, having won promotion from the A-class in 2020–21.

Financing and ownership
The club is owned by 11000 amateur investors, who bought shares in 2018, raising 20 million zł initially. It was the first such initiative in Poland.

In 2021 the club was crowdfunded under the initiative led by Krzysztof Stanowski. 3963 investors were found raising 4.5 million zł in 90 minutes for 25000 shares accounting for 20% of the total.

Notable players

KTS players were, among others, Merveille Fundambu and Jonathan Simba Bwanga, which later joined the leading clubs of the Poland First League, Wojciech Kowalczyk, the 1992 Summer Olympics medalist and Grzegorz Szamotulski, the Polish national team representative.

Statistics

References

External links
 - 90minut.pl profile
 -Official Facebook page

Football clubs in Warsaw
Association football clubs established in 2018
2018 establishments in Poland